High Times is the debut EP from the Georgia-based artist Washed Out. The EP only had a limited release on cassette tape initially.

On November 2, 2018, the EP was remixed and remastered on vinyl with four previously unreleased tracks.

Track listing

References

2009 debut EPs
Washed Out albums